Oscilloscope Laboratories is an independent film company and distributor founded by Adam Yauch and former TH!NKFilm executive David Fenkel. It also has a recording studio and film production facilities. Fenkel returned to the company on May 4, 2012, following Yauch's death. Shortly afterwards, Fenkel left the company in order to co-found A24 alongside Daniel Katz and John Hodges.

Oscilloscope is currently headed by Dan Berger. In 2009, the company signed a deal with Warner Bros. Digital Distribution.

Releases

References

External links
Official website

Beastie Boys
Film distributors of the United States
Mass media companies established in 2008
2008 establishments in New York City
Mass media companies based in New York City